Donald's Hill is a hill in County Londonderry, Northern Ireland. The summit reaches 399 metres above sea level and classifies as a Marilyn. Located at the edge of the Sperrin Mountains, the village of Drumsurn sits at the foot of the hill.

The Ordnance Survey Memoirs of 1834 records an alternative name of Knocknahurkle, which is believed to be derived from Irish Cnoc na hEarcola.

An ignimbrite formation can be found at the western edge of the plateau with approximately 30 kilometres of outcrop between Donald's Hill and Magherafelt.

Donald's Hill lies on the route of the North Sperrins Way section of the Ulster Way long distance walking circuit.

References

Links
 The University of Dublin, Trinity College, Department of Geology

Marilyns of Northern Ireland
Mountains and hills of County Londonderry
Volcanism of Northern Ireland